Adventure in Odessa or Inseparable Friends is a 1953 Soviet comedy drama film directed by Vasily Zhuravlyov and starring Mikhail Kuznetsov, Evgeniy Samoylov and Viktor Dobrovolsky.

Cast
 Mikhail Kuznetsov as Professor Belov  
 Evgeniy Samoylov as Gleb's Father  
 Viktor Dobrovolsky as School Director  
 Aleksandr Antonov as Chairman of the Collective Farm 
 Ivan Pelttser as Old Fisherman  
 Grigori Pluzhnik as Captain of the fishing ship  
 Misha Mokrinsky as Gleb  
 Volodya Lushchik as Vadim  
 Volodya Sudin as Kolya  
 Anatoli Shimanyuk as Vasya  
 Natasha Morel as Nina  
 Yuri Kritenko as Boatswain

References

Bibliography 
 Rollberg, Peter. Historical Dictionary of Russian and Soviet Cinema. Scarecrow Press, 2008.

External links 
 

1953 films
1953 comedy-drama films
Soviet comedy-drama films
1950s Russian-language films